Anopinella rastafariana is a species of moth of the family Tortricidae. It is found in Jamaica.

The length of the forewings is 7.5-8.5 mm.

The specific name is comes from Rastafari.

External links
Systematic revision of Anopinella Powell (Lepidoptera: Tortricidae: Euliini) and phylogenetic analysis of the Apolychrosis group of genera

Anopinella
Moths described in 2003
Moths of the Caribbean